Robert Priebsch (1866-1935) was a German professor and philologist.

From 1898 to 1931 he was a professor at University College London. With one of his students, W. E. Collinson, he published The German Language (1934). His two-volume Deutsche Handschriften in England (Erlangen 1896–1901) is a standard in the field.

His extensive collection of books and manuscripts was left to his daughter Hannah and his son-in-law August Closs; augmented significantly by Closs, the collection included 2300 volumes of 17th to 19th-century books which now comprise the Priebsch-Closs collection of the Institute of Germanic and Romance Studies in London.

His correspondence with Elias von Steinmeyer was edited and published by Closs.

Select bibliography
Robert Priebsch-Elias von Steinmeyer: Briefwechsel. Ausgewahlt und herausgegeben von August Closs (Berlin: Erich Schmidt, 1979)

References

1866 births
1935 deaths
Academics of University College London
Book and manuscript collectors
German scholars
Linguists from Germany
German philologists